Newcity is a media company based in Chicago, founded in 1986 by Brian and Jan Hieggelke." It started as the Newcity independent, free weekly newspaper in Chicago. Effective March 2017, the founders changed the newspaper into a glossy monthly free magazine, using the same Newcity name. As of March 2018, the firm also "publishes a suite of content-focused web sites", also under the Newcity name, and creates custom publications to order.

Content 
Newcity specializes in music, stage, film and art and is notable for launching the careers of numerous cartoonists and writers and art critics. The publication was described by the Chicago Tribune in 1995 as "sophisticated" and as an "alternative weekly" which was a niche publication in the digital space in 2005. Between 2000 and 2010, It reported its newspaper circulation within Chicago to be about 70,000 per week. A popular issue is its Best of Chicago feature in writers assign the best and worst of Chicago culture and politics. It covered issues such as traffic congestion; for example, a 2010 editorial called for the city to value walkers as much as drivers.

The newspaper was one of the first to publish the work of cartoonist Chris Ware as well as Harvey Pekar and his collaborator Tara Seibel. Newcity also published comics by Ivan Brunetti and non-fiction graphic journalism by Patrick W. Welch and Carrie Golus. Newcity's senior editors included Tom Lynch as well as writer Nate Lee. Newcity also publishes writers including Michael Nagrant who also writes for The Huffington Post. It also had movie reviews by critic and photographer Ray Pride.

References

External links

Newspapers published in Chicago
Magazines published in Chicago
Free newspapers
Alternative weekly newspapers published in the United States
1998 establishments in Illinois
Newspapers established in 1998
Magazines established in 2017